The yellow-striped chevrotain (Moschiola kathygre) is a species of chevrotain described in 2005. It is found in the wet zones of Sri Lanka. It was recognized as a species distinct from Moschiola meminna based on the phylogenetic species concept.

Description
Head and body length in the species is typically  43–51 cm. Dorsally, it is a  warm yellowish brown in color with at least two light yellow stripes longitudinally along flanks separated by a row of light yellow spots. Two distinct stripes along back plus another below the tail, all are pale yellow in color. Fur is fine and coarse.  Tusk-like upper canines are visible in males.

References

Chevrotains
Mammals of Sri Lanka
Mammals described in 2005